Night on Earth is an album by Tom Waits, released in 1992 on Island Records. It is the soundtrack to the 1991 Jim Jarmusch film of the same name.

Track listing
All tracks written by Tom Waits, except where noted. Songs arranged by Tom Waits and Francis Thumm. Recorded and mixed by Biff Dawes and assisted by Joe Marquez at Prairie Sun Studios.

Personnel
 Tom Waits - vocals, pump organ, drums, percussion, piano
 Ralph Carney - trumpet, alto saxophone, tenor saxophone, bass clarinet, clarinet, baritone horn, pan pipes
 Josef Brinckmann - accordion
 Matthew Brubeck - cello
 Joe Gore - guitar, banjo
 Clark Suprynowitz - bass
 Francis Thumm - harmonium, Stinson band organ

1992 soundtrack albums
Tom Waits soundtracks
Island Records soundtracks
Comedy film soundtracks
Drama film soundtracks